C. montanus may refer to:

Callistemon montanus, or mountain bottlebrush
Cercocarpus montanus, or mountain mahogany
Caelostomus montanus, a ground beetle in the subfamily Pterostichinae
Chalcides montanus, a skink found in the Atlas Mountains in Morocco
Cophixalus montanus, a frog species endemic to Indonesia
Cybaeus montanus, a spider of the family Cybaeidae